Pádraigín is a given name in the Irish language, formed by adding the diminutive suffix -ín to the name  Pádraig (the Irish equivalent of Patrick). The suffix was formerly used as a hypocoristic, giving a male pet name akin to"little Pádraig"; latterly it was a feminiser used to Gaelicise Patricia, the English feminine form of Patrick.

People with the given name
 Pádraigín Haicéad (c.1604–1654), Dominican priest and Irish-language poet
 Padraigín Ní Mhurchú (1949–2019), Irish trade unionist
 Pádraigín Ní Uallacháin (fl. 1976–2010s), Irish singer, songwriter and academic
 Enya (born 1961), Irish singer, real name Eithne Pádraigín Ní Bhraonáin

References

Irish feminine given names
Irish-language feminine given names